This is a list of recording artists who have reached number one on the singles chart in Spain, published by Productores de Música de España (PROMUSICAE) since 1959.

All acts are listed alphabetically.
Solo artists are alphabetized by last name, Groups by group name excluding "el", las, "los", and "la".
Each act's total of number-one singles is shown after their name.
All artists who are mentioned in song credits are listed here; this includes one-time pairings of otherwise solo artists and those appearing as featured. Members of a group who reached number one are excluded, unless they hit number one as a solo artist.

0–9

112 (1)
2 Fabiola (1)
2 Unlimited (2)
6ix9ine (1)

A

ABBA (1)
El Alfa (1)
 El Arrebato (1)
Anuel AA (6)
Gregory Abbott (1)
Ace of Base (3)
Adele (1)
Aerosmith (1)
Christina Aguilera (4)
Aitana (4)
The Alan Parsons Project (1)
Alaska y Dinarama (3)
Alaska y Los Pegamoides (1)
Al Bano and Romina Power (1)
Pablo Alborán (7)
Rauw Alejandro (3)
 Alejo (1)
Alexia (1)
Alizée (1)
Marc Anthony (2)
Amaral (1)
 Amnesia (1)
Anastacia (2)
 Juan Antonio canta (1)
Aqua (1)
Rosana Arbelo (2)
Arcángel (1)
 Atawalpa (1)
Rick Astley (2)
Astrud (1)
Auryn (1)
Avicii (2)
Azul y Negro (1)

B

Cardi B (1)
Backstreet Boys (3)
Bad Bunny (12)
Bad Gyal (1)
Tonino Baliardo (1)
J Balvin (9)
Baltimora (1)
Band Aid 20 (1)
Band Aid 30 (1)
Rigoberta Bandini (1)
The Bangles (1)
Gary Barlow (2)
Carlos Baute (1)
B.B.E. (1)
Bee Gees (2)
Lou Bega (1)
Ana Belén (3)
Belinda (2)
Beth (1)
Bia (1)
Justin Bieber (1)
Big Mountain (1)
David Bisbal (6)
Bizarrap (6)
Bjork (1)
The Black Eyed Peas (1)
Blind Guardian (1)
 Blue 4 You (1)
Blondie (1)
Bloodhound Gang (1)
DJ Bobo (1)
Bon Jovi (2)
Jon Bon Jovi (1)
Miguel Bosé (5)
Boys Town Gang (1)
Break Machine (1)
 Brray (1)
La Buena Vida (1)
Descemer Bueno (1)
Enrique Bunbury (5)
Buraka Som Sistema (1)
David Bustamante (1)
The Buggles (1)

C

 Caballero (2)
Francis Cabrel (1)
 Cruz Cafuné (2)
Cali & El Dandee (3)
Irene Cara (1)
Kim Carnes (1)
El Cata (1)
Roberto Carlos (1)
Manuel Carrasco (1)
Tino Casal (3)
C.C. Catch (1)
Mariah Carey (1)
Cepeda (1)
Chayanne (3)
Chenoa (1)
The Chemical Brothers (3)
Cher (1)
Chimo Bayo (2)
Melanie C (2)
 Circus (1)
 Chloe (1)
 Cooper (1)
 Lapiz Conciente (1)
The Communards (2)
Chencho Corleone (1)
Corona (1)
Jhay Cortez (2)
Nikka Costa (1)
The Cranberries (1)
Crazy Frog (3)
 Ororo (1)
 Co.Ro (1)
Crystal Waters (1)
Raúl Fuentes Cuenca (1)
The Cure (3)
Culture Club (1)
Miley Cyrus (1)

D

Pino D'Angiò (1)
Daft Punk (1)
Darell (1)
David DeMaría (1)
F. R. David (1)
Deacon Blue (1)
Los Del Rio (1)
 Los DelTonos (1)
 Deluxe (1)
Depeche Mode (10)
Desireless (1)
Diana Ross (1)
Dire Straits (1)
Celine Dion (2)
Dino (1)
DJ Jazzy Jeff & the Fresh Prince (1)
 Dogma Crew (1)
Double You (1)
Dover (2)
Dr.Alban (1)
Drake (1)
Duki (1)
Bob Dylan (1)

E

Niño de Elche (1)
Electric Light Orchestra (3)
 Ellegibo (1)
Eminem (2)
Enigma (1)
Gloria Estefan (3)
Yaiza Esteve (1)
Estopa (3)
 Estirpe (1)
Europe (1)
Faith Evans (1)
Evelyn Thomas (1)
EX-3 (2)

F

 Ricardo F (1)
Fairground Attraction (1)
Falco (1)
Fangoria (5)
Farruko (1)
Feid (1)
Jose Feliciano (1)
Felix (1)
Fine Young Cannibals (1)
Rosario Flores (1)
Luis Fonsi (2)
Zucchero Fornaciari (1)
 Fraktal 2 (1)
 José el Francés (1)
Frankie Goes To Hollywood (1)
Freshlyground (1)

G

Becky G (3)
Karol G (5)
 Wilfred y la Gagna (1)
Dave Gahan (1)
 Nio Garcia (2)
Gary Low (2)
Leif Garrett (1)
Gazebo (1)
Gente De Zona (2)
Gipsy Kings (1)
Tata Golosa (1)
Goldfrapp (1)
Selena Gomez (1)
Loretta Goggi (1)
Goombay Dance Band (1)
Gorillaz (1)
Ellie Goulding (1)
Eddy Grant (1)
Green Day (1)
Ana Guerra (1)
David Guetta (1)
El Guincho (1)
Guns N' Roses (1)
Guru Josh (1)
Gypsy Teens (1)

H

 La Habitación Roja (1)
Haddaway (2)
 Abhir Hathi (1)
Hall and Oates (1)
Hampenberg (1)
Ofra Haza (1)
Patrick Hernandez (1)
Héroes del Silencio (1)
High School Musical Cast (1)
Himno oficial del centenario (1)
Whitney Houston (3)
La Húngara (1)
 Hygo (1)

I

Enrique Iglesias (7)
Julio Iglesias (4)
Imagination (1)
Inna (1)
 Innocence (1)
Iron Maiden (3)
Natalie Imbruglia (1)
Iván (3)

J

Nicky Jam (2)
Jamiroquai (1)
Janet Jackson (1)
Michael Jackson (20)
Jam & Spoon (1)
Carlos Jean (1)
 María Jesús y su Acordeón (1)
Vika Jigulina (1)
Elton John (1)
Jive Bunny and the Mastermixers (2)
Jordy (1)
Tom Jones (1)
 Juanka (1) 
 Juhn (1)
 Juseph (1)
JX (1)

K

Kaoma (1)
Mory Kanté (1)
Ketama (1)
Las Ketchup (1)
Alicia Keys (1)
King Africa (1)
Mark Knopfler (1)
The Korgis (1)

L

L.A. Style (1)
Lady Gaga (5)
Cherry Laine (1)
Los Legendarios (1)
John Lennon (1)
Annie Lennox (1)
Level 42 (1)
Lilly Wood and the Prick (1)
Lime (1)
Lipps Inc (1)
Los Lobos (1)
Paulo Londra (3)
Loona (1)
Londonbeat (1)
Jennifer Lopez (3)
Pablo López (1)
Lil' Kim (1)
Limahl (1)
Lucenzo (1)
 DJ Luian (1)
Demi Lovato (1)
Lunay (1)

M

Macaco (1)
Mocedades (1)
Madonna (21)
Real Madrid (1)
Juan Magan (3) 
Mägo de Oz (2)
 Casper Magico (1)
Malú (2)
Víctor Manuel (1)
Manu Chao (1)
Maluma (2)
Mambo Kingz (1)
Pedro Marín (1)
Victor Manuel (2)
Bruno Mars (1)
Dani Martín (1)
Ricky Martin (2)
Sam Martin (1)
Vanesa Martín (1)
 Germano Enrico Martina (1)
 Marey (1)
Edward Maya (1)
Paul McCartney (3)
MC Sar & the Real McCoy (1)
Mecano (4)
Glenn Medeiros (1)
Melendi (1)
Melody (1)
Freddie Mercury (1)
Metallica (1)
George Michael (7)
MC Miker G & DJ Sven (1)
Robert Miles (1)
Nicki Minaj (1)
Kylie Minogue (3)
Missy Elliott (1)
Milli Vanilli (1)
Miami Sound Machine (1)
Modern Talking (4)
Modjo (1)
Amaia Montero (1)
Omar Montes (1)
 Mora (1)
Morad (2)
Claudia Mori (1)
Miguel Ángel Muñoz (1)
Murray Head (1)
Musical Youth (1)
Mýa (1)

N

Nacho (1)
 Nacho cano y los osm (1)
 Miguel Nández (1)
Mónica Naranjo (5)
Natti Natasha (2)
Olivia Newton-John (2)
New Trolls (1)
Nicki Nicole (2)
Nightwish (1)
Nirvana (1)
Alex de la Nuez (1)

O

Gilbert O'Sullivan (1)
Oasis (2)
OBK (1)
Mike Oldfield (1)
Don Omar (2)
One Direction (1)
Operación Triunfo (2)
Opus (1)
Orchestral Manoeuvres in the Dark (2)
Ottawan (1)
Shalim Ortiz (1)
The Outhere Brothers (1)
Mark Owen (1)
Ozuna (6)
O-Zone (1)

P

 Paco Pil (2)
Robert Palmer (1)
 La Pantera (1)
 Sylvia Pantoja (1)
Ryan Paris (1)
Ray Parker Jr. (1)
 Don Patrico (1)
Peaches & Herb (1)
 Pecos (2) 
Nathy Peluso (1)
Fran Perea (1)
José Luis Perales (3)
Pet Shop Boys (3)
Pimpinela (1)
Pink (3)
Pitbull (5)
Los Planetas (2)
The Police (1)
 Por Ellas (1)
Prince (1)
Propaganda (1)
Proyecto Uno (1)
PSY (1)
Puff Daddy (1)

Q

Queen (2)
Quevedo (4)
Justin Quiles (1)

R

Robert Ramirez (1)
Rammstein (1)
Ramón (1)
 Rochy RD (1)
Redone (1)
Reincidentes (1)
 Ramirez (1)
Eros Ramazzotti (1)
 J. Rapallo (1)
Nicolas Reyes (1)
Ricchi e Poveri (1)
Lionel Richie] (1)
Rihanna (1)
Andy Rivera (1)
 Kiko Rivera (1)
 ROBI (1)
Rockwell (1)
Mala Rodríguez (1)
The Rolling Stones (1)
Mark Ronson (1)
Rosalía (10)
Roxette (1)
Prince Royce (1)
Paulina Rubio (1)
Jennifer Rush (1)
Cristina Sánchez Ruiz (1)
Emilia Rydberg (1)

S

Joaquín Sabina (1)
Sandy & Papo (1)
Romeo Santos (1)
Tony Santos (1)
Alejandro Sanz (4)
Marta Sánchez (2)
Paloma San Basilio (1)
Scatman John (2)
Camilo Sesto (1)
Robin Schulz (1)
Scooter (1)
 Scorpia (1)
Travis Scott (1)
Sech (1)
 Rafa González-Serna (1)
 Sensity World (1)
Shakira (10)
 Shotta (1)
Sia (1)
Sin With Sebastian (1)
Skizoo (1)
 Sky (1)
The Smashing Pumpkins (1)
DJ Snake (1)
Snap! (4)
Snow (1)
Pastora Soler (1)
Spagna (1)
 Spanic (1)
Spanish Fly (1)
Britney Spears (3)
Bruce Springsteen (2)
Sigue Sigue Sputnik (1)
Stardust (1)
Stars On 45 (1)
Lisa Stansfield (1)
Princess Stéphanie of Monaco (1)
Rod Stewart (2)
The Steve Miller Band (1)
Barbra Streisand (1)
El Sueño de Morfeo (1)
Sugarhill Gang (1)
Sugarless (1)
Supa T & The Party Animals (1)
 Tony Sweat (1)

T

T.I. (1)
Tacabro (1)
Take That (3)
Tainy (2)
Taiu (1)
Tamara (1)
C. Tangana (5)
t.A.T.u. (1)
 Tarlisa (1)
David Tavaré (1)
Tatool (1)
Technotronic (2)
Michel Teló (1)
 Terra Wan (1)
Chanel Terrero (1)
Robin Thicke (1)
Naim Thomas (1)
Justin Timberlake (3)
Ana Torroja (1)
Myke Towers (7)
Umberto Tozzi (2)
Meghan Trainor (1)
John Travolta (1)
Manuel Turizo (3)
Trueno (1)
Tina Turner (2)
Twenty 4 Seven (1)

U

U2 (8)
 Danni Úbeda (1)
La Unión (1)
USA for Africa (1)

V
Vega (1)
VideoKids (1)
Violadores del Verso (1)
Viva (1)
Carlos Vives (1)

W

Alan Walker (1)
Anita Ward (1)
Wax (1)
The Weeknd (1)
The Who (1)
Des'ree (2)
Will.i.am (1)
Willy William (1)
Wisin (2)
Pharrell Williams (4)
Whigfield (1)
White Town (1)
Robbie Williams (2)
Tony Wilson (1)
Stevie Wonder (3)

X

Xtreme (1)
Xuxa (1)

Y

 Yandar & Yostin (1)
Daddy Yankee (6)
Sebastián Yatra (2)

Z

 Zzoilo (1)

References

Singles chart on Spanishcharts.com site
Top 20 Singles on PROMUSICAE site

Spain Singles Chart